Adolfo de Hostos (January 8, 1887 in Santo Domingo, Dominican Republic – October 29, 1982 in San Juan, Puerto Rico) served in the mid twentieth century, from January 1936 to 1950, as the fifth Official Historian of Puerto Rico,
 a position created in March, 1903, by the Puerto Rico Legislature.

Early life
He was the son of Eugenio María de Hostos and had several brothers and sisters: Eugenio Carlos, Luisa Amelia, Bayoán Lautaro, Filipo Luis Duarte, María Angelina In 1939, he corresponded with his brother Eugenio Carlos de Hostos excitedly relaying how he hoped to have his publication, be included in the newspaper Puerto Rico Ilustrado.

Military career
De Hostos had served in the Army and as military aide to Gov. Arthur Yeager before his appointment by Gov. Blanton Winship.

Official historian
His most prominent publication is "Ciudad Murada", the history of the city of San Juan, Puerto Rico, the United States' oldest city.

After his retirement in 1950, the position of Official Historian  remained vacant for 43 years, until the Puerto Rico House of Representatives approved in 1993 Senate Concurrent Resolution 14, authored by Sen. Kenneth McClintock, designated Dr. Pilar Barbosa.

De Hostos spearheaded the excavation at a location in Guaynabo, finding remnants of early European settlement in Puerto Rico. The location is now called the Caparra Archaeological Site.

De Hostos made an important contribution to pre-Columbian archaeology with his book titled "Anthropological Papers: Based Principally on Studies of the Prehistoric Archaeology and Ethnology of the Greater Antilles" published in 1941.

Death
Adolfo de Hostos died on October 29, 1982 in San Juan, Puerto Rico and was buried at Santa María Magdalena de Pazzis Cemetery in San Juan.

References

20th-century Puerto Rican historians
1887 births
1982 deaths
Burials at Santa María Magdalena de Pazzis Cemetery
Dominican Republic emigrants to Puerto Rico
Historians of Puerto Rico